Cananea is a city in the Mexican state of Sonora, Northwestern Mexico. It is the seat of the Municipality of Cananea, in the vicinity of the U.S−Mexico border.

The population of the city was 31,560 as recorded by the 2010 census. The population of the municipality, which includes rural areas, was 32,936.

History

The first non-indigenous inhabitants of the present day Cananea, arrived in 1760 from other parts of the Spanish Viceroyalty of New Spain (colonial México).

In the 19th century General Ignacio Pesqueira, from nearby Arizpe, retired to Cananea. He fought against the Apache who raided the area. One time, while following them into the mountains, he discovered the abandoned Spanish mines and by 1868 he had renewed the extraction of minerals in the Cananea mines.  General Pesqueira's wife, Elena Pesqueira Pesqueira, "discovered" a nearby mountain range (sierra) and the General named the highest peak La Elenita ("The Little Helen", 9,327 feet or 2,843 meters above sea level) in her honor. The other peak is named La Mariquita ("The Little Mary", 8,123 feet or 2,476 meters above sea level).

In 1889 William Cornell Greene purchased the mine from General Pesqueira and founded the Nogales, Sonora-based company, The Cananea Consolidated Copper Company, S. A. (CCCC or 4C).  In June 1906, a labor dispute erupted into the violent cross-border Cananea strike, that resulted in the death of 23 people and dozens injured, in a fight between the strikers and a posse led by Arizona Rangers from the United States. A corrido titled La cárcel de Cananea ("Cananea jail") written in 1917 and commemorating the incident has since become famous. At the time of the strike the population of 23,000 included 7,000 Americans and 5,000 Chinese.

On October 31, 1901, the area became a municipality with Cananea town as its seat. On July 11, 1957, Cananea town became a city.

Cananea jail
The Cananea jail was built in 1903 and is located in downtown Cananea. It was the first public jail of the city and is currently a museum "Museo de la Lucha Obrera" with exhibitions of photographs and instruments used in mining.

La carcel de Cananea or The Cananea Jail song is a corrido that has become part of the culture of Cananea and the state of Sonora. It describes the experiences of a man accused of murdering Chinese immigrants while at this jail. According to historian Rodolfo Rascón, a man called Francisco, nicknamed El Cucharón de Batuc ("The Big Spoon of Batuc"), wrote the song in 1917.

Climate
The municipality of Cananea has a sub-humid Mediterranean climate (Köppen climate classification Csa), with an average monthly maximum temperature of 74.3 °F (23.5 °C) in the months of June to September and an average monthly minimum of 45.3 °F (7.4 °C) in December and January; the average annual temperature is 59.5 °F (15.3 °C).

Atypically for the Mediterranean climate type, the dry season occurs in spring and early summer, whereas the rainy season is in mid/late summer and autumn. Through winter the rains are less intense, but of longer duration. Called “”, they can fall in the form of snow. In the months of February, March, and April there are frequent frosts, hailstorms, and occasional snowstorms. Precipitation averages at  annually.

City government

The Heroic City of Cananea, which serves as the head of the municipality, is the seat of local government. Its council is made up of a municipal president (mayor), a trustee, six councilors elected by majority vote and four by proportional representation.  Each serves a three-year term. The total of all terms for a person cannot exceed six years.

Legislative representation

The municipality is integrated into the following electoral districts for the election of local representatives to the State of Sonora's Legislature and federal representatives to the Mexican Chamber of Deputies: 
Local: The Agua Prieta-based VII Electoral District of the State of Sonora's Congress.
Federal: Heroic Nogales serves as the seat of the II Federal Electoral District of Sonora for the Mexican Chamber of Deputies.

Mayors

Economy

Mining

Mining is the main source of revenue for Cananea and will be for the foreseeable future. Eighty percent of the population is directly or indirectly supported by mining companies in Cananea. The first and most important mining company is Buenavista del Cobre, S.A. de C.V. (formerly Mexicana de Cananea, S.A. de C.V.) owned by the Southern Copper Corporation, and still shares ownership with Grupo Mexico, S.A.B. de C.V. The Buenavista open-pit copper mine in Sonora, Mexico is one of the biggest porphyry copper deposits in the world. Producing since 1899, it is the oldest operating copper mine in North America. The deposit was mined exclusively through underground methods until the Anaconda Copper Mining Company started open-pit operations in the early 1940s. Grupo Mexico has continuously expanded the Buenavista operation since it acquired the property for US$475m in 1990. 
The Buenavista mine produced 965 million pounds (Mlbs) of copper in 2019 which accounted for approximately 44% of Southern Copper’s total copper production during the year. The mine also produces silver and molybdenum as by-products. 
Cananea is among the world's largest copper mines in terms of reserves.

The building of a concentrator with an annual production capacity of 100,000 tons of zinc and 20,000 extra tons of copper has already started at the Buenavista Zinc project in Cananea, Sonora. The project has a total budget of US$416 million, of which the majority has already been invested.
The engineering study was also finished, and the project has all the required permits.
The new concentrator will increase the capacity of producing zinc once the project is operational and provide more than 2,000 operating jobs.
Operations should start in the second half of 2023.

A miners strike at the Buenavista del Cobre mine lasted almost three years, until broken on the night of June 6, 2010, when Mexican police dispersed striking workers. On June 6, 2011, the Confederation of Mexican Workers (“CTM”) was granted the collective bargaining agreement for the Buenavista union, replacing the miner's National Union of Mining and Metallurgical Workers Sindicate, Section No.65 (Labor Union), headed by Napoleón Gómez Urrutia.

The second and smaller active copper mine is "Minera Maria", owned by Minera Frisco, S.A.B. de C.V. a Mexican company controlled by Carlos Slim Helú and family, including Inmobiliaria Carso, S.A. de C.V. and located west of Cananea. The plant has an installed monthly production capacity of 2,500 tons of copper cathode.

Industry
Light industry is the second most important activity in the local economy, generating approximately 3,100 jobs. The most important are "Fullfillment Systems de México", "Stewart Connectors Systems de Mexico", "Datacenter del Norte", "Customer Specific Cables". In other section they have "Fundidora de Cananea, S.A.", a manufacturer of ball mill liners, and "Road Machinery Company de México, S.A."—which all aforementioned companies together provide approximately 600 jobs and are involved in diverse activities, from cable assembly to steel fabrication.

The intent to open a concrete products industrial park north of Cananea was announced in January 2018 by Ing. Glenn Edward Roy E. of "Ferrocret", a conglomerate that shall produce all manner of precast concrete products such as: hydro conduit; walls, floors, and ceilings of affordable housing; drycast concrete pavers; cinder block; concrete railway sleepers. The factories will utilise proprietary fast-cure concrete formulations in combination with the abundant nearly free-of-cost copper slag "escoria"—an aggregate alternative to expensive riverbed-mined gravel. Over one hundred years of mining activities at Cananea have generated huge manmade mountains of copper slag... thereby providing an ideal, low-cost alternative for supplying graded aggregates for inclusion within those various precast concrete products. Precast concrete products manufacturing promises to become a major industry in the region, and one which shall lessen the dependence of the Cananea job force on a local economy that historically solely has been dependent upon the mines remaining open.

Agriculture
Cattle raising is important and there were approximately 16,000 head in the last census.

Farming consists mainly of corn, potatoes, beans, sorghum, alfalfa, barley, and apples.  Most of these crops are used for local consumption and cattle fodder.  The infrastructure consists of 30 wells, equipped with a system of electrical motors, and 10 kilometers (6 mi) of reinforced canals used for irrigation.

Twin towns 
  Rio Blanco, Veracruz, Mexico (1980)
  Sierra Vista, Arizona, United States (1989)
  Radebeul, Germany (2004)
  Tijuana, Baja California, Mexico (2007)
  Bisbee, Arizona, United States (2014)

Notable residents 
Raul Hector Castro - 14th Governor of U.S. State of Arizona
William Cornell Greene - Founder of modern Cananea, The Greene Consolidated Copper Company and The Cananea Consolidated Copper Company.  
Aurelio Rodríguez - Mexican Baseball Hall of Fame inductee
Claudio Xavier Gonzalez Laporte - Chairman of Kimberly-Clark de México and President of the Mexican Business Council.

References

  Site of the presidency of the municipality of Cananea
  Cananea at the site of the Government of Sonora
  The Cananea Strike at the Universidad Obrera de México
  Cananea at La Jornada
  http://www.elimparcial.com/EdicionEnLinea/Notas/Noticias/28052007/242450.aspx
  Sindicato Minero Seccion 65 of Cananea

External links
 —Official Cananea Municipal Government website

 
Populated places in Sonora
Mining communities in Mexico
1906 in Mexico